The Korg 01/W is a workstation synthesizer, released in 1991, and was intended to replace the M1 and T series. The workstation/ROMpler was based on AI², an improved version of the AI (Advanced Integrated) Synthesis technology found in the M1. The success of the AI² architecture ensured it was used in the majority of subsequent Korg synths of the 1990s.

Variations
01/W: The basic 61 key model. Did not sell well due to its very small amount of sequencer memory.
01/WFD: Same as above, but with greatly increased sequencer memory and internal floppy disk drive.
01/Wpro: Same as above, but with an extra octave of keys (for a total of 76 keys) and an extra sampled Acoustic Piano sound.
01/WproX: This model had 88 weighted keys (to simulate the feel of a real acoustic piano) and also has the extra Acoustic Piano found in the 01/Wpro
01R/W: A 2U high rackmount version of the 01/WFD, with the sequencer maintained from the keyboard versions but without a floppy disk drive. 
03R/W: A stripped-down version of the 01R/W Rack, 1U in height, with a smaller screen, only about 90% of the samples found in its bigger brother, and no waveshaping. It was General MIDI compatible and the sequencer was removed.

There was also the subsequent Korg 05R/W half size 1U rack unit released in 1993. In spite of its name it was actually based on the Korg X3 and essentially served as a prelude to the X3's successor, the original Korg X5 keyboard that was released the following year. It was GM compliant and, while it didn't include a sequencer and had only half as many patches, it did include a serial interface for Mac/PC.

Improvements over the M1

254 sampled instruments in 6 megabytes of ROM (the M1 had 100 sampled instruments) (The T-Series has 8mb of ROM with about 190 sampled instruments)
The AI2 Synthesis produced much cleaner and perhaps slightly thinner sound and twice as many effects were available when compared with the M1 and T series. 
Korg introduced a feature called Waveshaping.
The 01/WFD, 01/Wpro, 01WproX models had an internal 3.5" floppy disk drive that could read single-sided 720k floppy disks, custom Korg format.
The sequencer of The 01/WFD, 01/Wpro, 01WproX could hold up to 47 thousand notes, several times more than the M1 but less than the T-Series.
The polyphony was doubled to a maximum of 32 notes with 16 tracks/MIDI parts (as opposed to the 16 note polyphony and 8 track Sequencer of the M1 and T-Series).

Key differences

The 01/W only had a few of the M1's samples. Particularly missing were the M1 Acoustic Piano, and some of the M1 Electric Piano sounds. These were replaced by more realistic versions (the Acoustic Piano in the 01/W was radically different and sounded more oriented for classical music). The 01/Wpro even went a step further and added another even more realistic Acoustic Piano.

The M1's piano was so bright and metallic sounding that it found its niche in Dance/Electronica and some Latin Music where it could cut through the mix easily. Korg acknowledged this fact by integrating their M1 piano back on later incarnations of the X range, such as in the X5D synth and N264/364 workstations.

The 01/W also added more electric piano sounds, having at least 5 times as many, therefore becoming one of the standard keyboards used in smooth jazz, which often uses electric piano sounds.

The 01/W introduced a feature called "Waveshaping". This was a feature where each sample value was run through a non-linear function, and thereby producing new harmonics. This is similar to the way a tube amp distorts sound. It was possible to select from 59 different waveshapes having names like "Rezzy", "Parabola" & "Comb", to transform/distort the sound. Waveshaping would add different harmonics to the sound depending on the selected waveshape, but the added harmonics depended also heavily on what kind of sample that was fed into the waveshaping function. The waveshaping feature could make some very interesting sonic textures as it would literally reshape the sound to fit that specific waveshape. However, the feature was discontinued on subsequent models. Original sounds were achievable but required significant experimentation, as using waveshaping on stock samples often only seemed to add distortion.

The 0 series took a step backward from the T series in one area: the 1-megabyte sample RAM, on which users could load their own multisamples, was removed. More current workstations almost invariably have integrated samplers or user sample playback features.

Sonic character

The 01/W is also known for its "warmth". It has been suggested the 01/W sounded richer than the Korg synths that came afterward. The two most probable reasons for that are:
 The 01/W's samples were recorded at 16 bit 32 kHz. Subsequent Korg synths had their samples recorded at 16 bit 44.1 kHz. The sample rate of 32 kHz limited the frequencies possible in any sample to below 16 kHz, instead of the 22.05 kHz of later synths by Korg. 
 More ROM memory was allocated to each sample than the synths following afterward (As an example, the 01/W used 6 MB of ROM to fit 254 compressed samples. The Korg X3 also used 6 MB to fit 334 compressed samples in its ROM)

The fact that the 01/W's samples were recorded at a slightly lower sampling rate, therefore reducing sample size, plus the advantage of having more ROM memory meant that longer samples could be stored, possibly adding more realism to sustained sounds and so forth. The 32 kHz frequency might give the illusion of a more acoustic instrument, because it might be perceived as reducing the amount of high frequencies, which tend to be attenuated in physical/analogue instruments when compared to digital ones.

Options
XSC PCM cards set
XPC ROM cards
SRC512 RAM card
VUK01W ROM upgrade kit

Name origin
Reportedly, the 01/W was originally intended to be named the M10, but the marketing department read the name upside down.

Notable users
This list represents a small, incomplete range of artists who have used Korg 01/Ws.

Phil Collins

Jean-Michel Jarre

Chad Hugo

Jun Senoue
Keith Emerson
Marcos Witt
Juan Carlos Alvarado
Alex Staropoli
Joe Zawinul
Juana Molina

 Viju Shah

References

Further reading

Sonicstate's SynthSite: http://www.sonicstate.com/synth/korg01w.cfm
Online Guide to the 01/W: http://net.indra.com/~cliffcan/01online.htm
How to repair Korg 01/W broken audio out: http://www.alchemystudio.it/Strumenti/Korg01/Korg01_en.htm
Korg 01W Audio demo: http://www.polynominal.com/site/studio/gear/synth/korg_01_R_W/

O
Music workstations
Digital synthesizers
Polyphonic synthesizers